The soft power of China is the indirect and non-military influence of the People's Republic of China that can be observed outside the country around the world. While soft power as a concept can be summarized as "get others to do your bidding" without resorting to hard power, it has been argued that the Chinese government uses a different approach (especially in developed countries) to "get others to stop harming your image" which is more in line with its internal policies.

Soft power rankings 
China ranked 2nd out of 20 nations in the Elcano Global Presence Report for 2018 by the Elcano Royal Institute. The report noted that China's Reputation ranking (24th) was considerably lower than its Influence ranking (2nd).

According to the 2019 Asia Power Index, China takes the lead in diplomatic influence and ranks 2nd out of 25 countries in cultural influence after the US.

China's ranked 27th out of 30 nations in the Soft Power 30 index for 2018 and 2019 published by Portland Communications and the USC Center on Public Diplomacy. According to the index, China is a "cultural juggernaut", being ranked 8th in the Culture category and 10th in the Engagement category.

Global influence and diplomacy 

China's traditional culture has been a source of attraction, building on which it has created several hundred Confucius Institutes around the world to teach its language and culture. The enrollment of foreign students in China has increased from 36,000 a decade ago to at least 240,000 in 2010. China is the most popular country in Asia for international students, the leading destination globally for Anglophone African students, and the second most popular education power house in the world. China's Asian Infrastructure Investment Bank has attracted many western countries to join. Increasing political pressure and scrutiny around the Confucius Institutes have led to some closures.

China has the largest diplomatic network in the world, overtaking the US in 2019.

A spring 2014 Global Attitudes survey from Pew Research Center states China receives mostly positive reviews in the sub-Saharan African nations polled, although South Africans are closely divided (45% favorable, 40% unfavorable).  China's increasing soft power can be explained by looking at China's economic growth and regarding economic engagement with many African countries. China's expansion of trade and investment on the African continent and the spread of Chinese-led infrastructure projects gives positive impressions of China to people in Africa. China's economic engagement in African countries is considered to be much more pragmatic and in consistency with the priorities of many African countries. Moreover, China's increasing role as a global superpower seems appealing and this drives a desire to tie African economies more closely to China's economy.

Through the use of GONGOs (otherwise known as a Government-organized non-governmental organization), China exerts soft power through foreign aid and development in Africa. China has made a systematic effort to expand and give a greater profile to its soft-power policies in Africa ever since the first Forum on China-Africa Cooperation in 2000. The commitments of China's soft power ranges from health, humanitarian assistance to academic, professional and cultural exchange.

Cultural exchange between China and Africa can be a representative example of how China has been spreading its soft power. In 2005, the first Confucius Institute was established in Africa. The institute is funded by the Chinese government and it provides Chinese language and cultural programming to the public. There are 19 institutes today in Africa and China has planned to spend 20 million RMB for education projects in South Africa, including the teaching of Mandarin in 50 local high schools.

Furthermore, there is an increasing support for cultural visitors programs which gained momentum in 2004 when the African Cultural Visitors Program was established. There is a rising number of African entrepreneurs who choose to move to China and there are also diaspora communities in many Chinese cities that have been found.

Outside of Africa, Chinese soft power extends to countries like Barbados. Barbadian Prime Minister David Thompson expressed admiration for the Chinese economic model and sought to emulate the way Chinese state controlled banks guided development. The Chinese soft-power in the Middle East countries has been expanding since the beginning of the millennium, and includes many efforts in the fields of education, journalism, and popular culture.

The use of Chinese medical aid during the COVID-19 pandemic has been dubbed "face-mask diplomacy".

See also 
 Hard power
 Cultural hegemony
 Cool Japan
 Chinese Dream
 Confucius Institute
 Xi Jinping Thought

References 

Power (social and political) theories